The George Blackley House, at 421 E. 200 North in Heber City, Utah, was built in 1877.  It was listed on the National Register of Historic Places in 1985.

It is a one-and-a-half-story central passage plan house with Carpenter Gothic styling. It was built in 1877-78 by George Blackley, a carpenter and joiner, who lived there until his death in 1902. He was born in England in 1830 and came to the U.S. and Utah in 1869.

References

		
National Register of Historic Places in Wasatch County, Utah
Houses completed in 1877
1877 establishments in Utah Territory